Jeffrey Steven Turner (born April 9, 1962) is an American retired professional basketball player and broadcasting announcer. Turner played ten NBA seasons (1984–1987; 1989–1996), spending time with the New Jersey Nets as well as the Orlando Magic.  He ended his NBA career with 3,697 career points. Turner was a 6' 9" forward/center. After his career ended he spent nine years as a radio color commentator for the Magic. He then served as the head boys basketball coach at Lake Highland Preparatory School in Orlando, Florida from to 2005 to 2013, where he compiled a 151-72 record and won the state title in 2013. From 2011 to 2013 he was also a studio analyst for Magic games. In 2013, Turner was named television color commentator for the Magic.

Turner starred as a college player for Vanderbilt University. He was selected by the New Jersey Nets with the 17th pick of the 1984 NBA Draft.

Turner was a member of the Gold Medal 1984 U.S. Olympic basketball team coached by Bobby Knight. The team included Michael Jordan, Patrick Ewing, Wayman Tisdale and Chris Mullin. Turner also played for the US national team in the 1982 FIBA World Championship, winning the silver medal.

Imposter
On June 4, 2008, the Associated Press reported that Ronnie Craven of Somerville, Massachusetts, had been posing as Turner and using the identity to facilitate sexual encounters with women he met in online chat rooms. His ruse also included the additional falsehood that "Jeff Turner" was employed in the front office of the Seattle SuperSonics (Turner has never worked for the Sonics). Craven says he has received a cease-and-desist order from a lawyer for the Sonics. Craven said he was embarrassed and would stop lying about his identity.

See also
 Vanderbilt Commodores men's basketball

References

External links

1962 births
Living people
American expatriate basketball people in Italy
American men's basketball players
Basketball players at the 1984 Summer Olympics
Basketball players from Maine
Centers (basketball)
Medalists at the 1984 Summer Olympics
New Jersey Nets draft picks
New Jersey Nets players
Olympic gold medalists for the United States in basketball
Orlando Magic announcers
Orlando Magic players
Pallacanestro Cantù players
Power forwards (basketball)
Sportspeople from Bangor, Maine
United States men's national basketball team players
Vanderbilt Commodores men's basketball players
People from Brandon, Florida
Sportspeople from Hillsborough County, Florida
1982 FIBA World Championship players